CTI Electronics Corporation is a manufacturer of industrial computer peripherals such as rugged keyboards, pointing devices, motion controllers, analog joysticks, USB keypads and many other industrial, military, medical, or aerospace grade input devices. CTI Electronics Corporation products are made in the United States and it is a well-known supplier of input devices to some of the most notable private defense contractors in the world, including Lockheed Martin, DRS Technologies, Computer Sciences Corporation, General Dynamics, BAE Systems, L3 Communications, AAI, Northrop Grumman, Raytheon, Boeing, Thales Group and many more companies that provide security and defense around the world. CTI also supplies Homeland Security and United States Department of Defense supporting their efforts in protecting and serving the country and military personnel of the United States.

Background 
CTI Electronics Corporation was started in 1986 and is currently located in Stratford, Connecticut.

Industries
CTI's products are used all over the world in a variety of industries and specialize in highly reliable industrial-grade input devices for use harsh environments. Its products are currently being used in the control systems of UAVs, UUVs, and UGVs. CTI has also donated industrial joysticks to students of UW-Madison to for research into the Standing Paraplegic Omni-directional Transport (SPOT)
These products are not only used for military but are also used in the medical, industrial, and aerospace industries all over the world.

Product certifications
NEMA 4
NEMA 4X
NEMA 12
IP54
IP66
RoHS
CE
ISO 9001:2008

References

External links
 CTI Electronics Home Page

Computer companies of the United States
Computer peripheral companies
Computer companies established in 1986
Electronics companies established in 1986
Companies based in Stratford, Connecticut
American companies established in 1986